Southern Hills Country Club is a private golf and country club in Tulsa, Oklahoma.

History 
The club was established in 1935 from land donated by multimillionaire oilman Waite Phillips (Frank Phillips, Waite's brother, was the namesake and founder of the predecessor to Phillips 66.  Waite worked with his brother for a time before starting his own oil company). Phillips had earned an oil fortune and, upon the crash of the stock market, Phillips became The First National Bank of Tulsa’s chairman. With his oil money and with his reputation, Bill Warren and Cecil Canary asked Phillips to sponsor the development of a new country club. The boosters argued that there was the need for a family-oriented club that would include a swimming pool, stable, horseback trails, polo field, skeet range, tennis courts, clubhouse and golf course. Phillips was skeptical of this proposition, and in response he told Warren and Canary that they had a couple of weeks to assume 150 pledges to become members of this club, with each of those pledges paying $1,000 each, to ensure his cooperation. The construction costs were raised by the founding members.  The clubhouse, designed in "English country manor" style by Tulsa architects John Duncan Forsyth and Donald McCormick, opened on October 17, 1936; the clubhouse was extensively renovated during a three-year project prior to the 2007 PGA tournament.

Murder 
On May 27, 1981, Roger Wheeler, a Tulsa businessman and owner of Miami's World Jai Alai, was murdered in the parking lot of the club. The killing was ordered by Winter Hill Gang mobster Whitey Bulger, who discovered that Wheeler had uncovered the gang's ongoing embezzlement from the jai alai organization.

Golf courses and amenities 
Once the money was raised, the pledges signed, and the land was donated, the main 18-hole golf course was laid out by golf course designer Perry Maxwell. The course was later on renovated by Keith Foster in 1999. Maxwell, a friend of Phillips, oversaw the entire project and its construction.

There is also a 9-hole West Course that was designed by Ben Crenshaw in 1992. Southern Hills also has the typical facilities of a country club, including extensive banqueting facilities, a fitness center, swimming and diving pools, and tennis courts. Southern Hills offers swimming, personal training, and tennis instruction. The course is ranked No. 30 among Golf Digest’s 2013-2014 “America’s 100 Greatest Golf Courses."

Course layout

Hole 1, 12, and 18 are par 5 for women.

Lengths of the course in previous major championships:

U.S. Open Championship
2001 : 6,973 yards , Par 70
1977 : 6,873 yards , Par 70
1958 : 6,907 yards , Par 70

PGA Championship
2022 : 7,556 yards , Par 70
2007 : 7,131 yards , Par 70
1994 : 6,834 yards , Par 70
1982 : 6,862 yards , Par 70
1970 : 6,962 yards , Par 70

Senior PGA Championship
2021 : 6,968 yards , Par 70

Golf tournaments hosted at Southern Hills 
Southern Hills has hosted eight major championships for men, including the U.S. Open three times (1958, 1977, 2001) and five PGA Championships (1970, 1982, 1994, 2007, 2022). It is the only course to host the PGA Championship five times. Southern Hills also hosted the first-ever U.S. Women's Mid-Amateur in 1987, and the U.S. Women's Amateur was played at Southern Hills in 1946.

Winners

Notes

References

External links
 
 Voices of Oklahoma interview with George Matson. First person interview conducted on January 28, 2015, with George Matson, Golf Shop manager of Southern Hills Country Club

Golf clubs and courses in Oklahoma
Sports in Tulsa, Oklahoma
Sports venues completed in 1936
1936 establishments in Oklahoma